(UEES) is a non-profit private university in Guayaquil, Ecuador. Its campus is in Samborondón, Greater Guayaquil. One distinctive program of UEES is the College of International Studies, home to the International Careers Program (ICP), which offers courses entirely in English, the School of Translation and Interpretation, the School of Foreign Languages and Applied Linguistics, and the Center for International Education.

Founded by Dr. Carlos Ortega Maldonado, it was accredited by CONESUP, then the Ecuadorian higher education governing agency.

History
UEES was founded in 1993, approved by the Ecuadorian Higher Education governing agency (CONESUP) and by then Ecuadorian President Sixto Durán-Ballén, and officially inaugurated at an opening ceremony a year later, with Dr. Carlos Ortega Maldonado appointed as the first chancellor.

Initially, UEES offered career programs through its Faculty of Economics and Business Science. The first full-time students were registered in 1995, some of them on a merit-based scholarship scheme known as Plan Talento. The Faculty of Law, Policy, and Development was added in 1997, along with the International Degree Program, created for students wishing to study entirely in English while at UEES and to transfer credits and complete their studies at other international or English-speaking universities.

As UEES moved into its new campus in 2001, new faculties were established for Computer Sciences, Telecommunications, and Electronics, and the Faculty of Liberal Arts and Sciences. In the next few years the faculties of Communication (2001), Architecture and Design (2002), Tourism and Hotel Management (2003), and International Studies (2004) were founded.

Campus
The campus includes research laboratories, a sports center (opened on 14 July 2007), chapel, three-storey library, shuttle service, limited lodging facilities for students from other cities or countries, and a fully equipped gym. The university will soon inaugurate the Museo de la Democracia.

Campus buildings are denoted by letters of the alphabet:
 Building A contains the university library.
 Building B contains art classrooms and special laboratories.
 Building C contains the offices of university staff including the President and Vice Presidents, as well as conference rooms and the Marketing and Public Relations Departments.
 Building C1 contains the Faculty Lounge, Health Care Department, and the College of Law, Policy, and Development.
 Building D contains Business Offices, the Financial Department, Admissions, Registrar's Office, Center for International Education, and Student Affairs Department.
 Building F contains the College of Law, College of Economics and Business Science, and on the ground floor are an Auditorium and a Mock Courtroom. Opposite this building is the chapel.
 Building G contains the College of Architecture and Design, College of Liberal Arts and Education Sciences and the Pastoral Department, which is in charge of the campus Chapel.
 Building P contains the College of Law, The College of International Studies, the School of Foreign Languages and Applied Linguistics.

Museum

The university has a small museum in Building F with original relics from ancient Ecuadorian cultures. These ceramic artifacts belong to cultures such as La Tolita, Jama-Coaque, Bahía, Guangala, Valdivia, Machalilla and Chorrera. The collection belongs to archaeologist Guillermo Hurel, a faculty member.

Organization

UEES is a private, non-profit, nonsectarian tuition-driven university. It requires its students to participate in a community service project before graduating. Most UEES courses are taught in Spanish (through the International Careers Program, UEES offers courses in English).

UEES students choose an academic program that requires completing 140 credits of coursework; students may earn diplomas such as Bachelor of Arts, or Bachelor of Science. UEES also has research departments and a teaching faculty for most academic disciplines. As of 2007, UEES offers 28 majors. The faculty of medicine offers two programs: Doctor in Medicine and a Nutrition degree diploma.

Schools and programs

Center for International Education
This center offers programs for international students running from four weeks to four months, in Spanish or English. Students on this program study the issues and problems of the Andean Region, Latin American development issues, and enrol in regular university courses.

Programs include:
"The Ecology of Coastal Ecuador", focusing on the ecosystem of the coastal region of Ecuador, combining academic study with fieldwork. Students visit Chirije ecological and archaeological park on the Ecuadorian coast; Bahia, a culturally and historically rich city; and the Galapagos Islands, which has a large population of endemic fauna.
"Community Health in a Developing Region", intended particularly for biology, pre-medicine, social work, or nursing majors, which involves observing alternative medical practices, including herbal medicine and folk healing.
"Economics and Business Studies in Ecuador"
"Intensive Spanish Language Program"
"The Ecuadorian Internship Program", placing international students in work placements in agencies, organizations, and companies in Guayaquil
"Serve and Learn Spanish in Ecuador", focusing on experiential learning in Community Development, Low-Income Housing Construction, Human Rights, Education and Special Education, Health, Recreation, Nurseries/Child Care, Nutrition, or Poverty Reduction.
"Professional Development Internships" in a wide range of industries.
"Socio-economic Development in Ecuador", combining coursework with business internships, community service, and cultural organization activities.

UEES maintains links with a large number of universities internationally, sending and receiving exchange students and allowing for transfer of credit between the universities.

UEES Chamber of Commerce
The UEES Chamber for Entrepreneurs (CEM-UEES) is a non-profit organization for young entrepreneurs and the first Entrepreneurship Chamber in Ecuador integrated by college students. The chamber is designed to promote and develop entrepreneurship among students, and to reduce the failure rate of students enterprises in its first year. It helps students with information, advice and research that they can use to create innovative businesses, and maintains contact with the public, private and community services about the activities of the chamber.

The chamber organizes conversatoriums, courses, fora and conferences that develop students as new managers and entrepreneurs, co-operates with other similar bodies to exchange skills and information, supplies students with advice regarding technology and finance, works with the UEES Public Relations Department to promote student entrepreneurship, and organizes fund-raising events.

Graduate degree programs
The Graduate School offers master's degree programs for business executives which are conducted at weekend courses, including Master in Business Administration, and Graduate Diplomas in Management of Marketing and Sales, and Higher Education.

Communication degrees

Journalism students can major in Printed Press, Audiovisual Journalism or International Journalism. Communication Management students can major in Public Relations and Events, Corporate Communication, or Human and Organizational Development.

UEES media center 

UEES has a broadcasting media center which includes a radio station and a TV studio, used by Communication Studies students to gain experience of making, recording and editing TV and radio broadcasts.

UEES has two magazines. One of them, Campus, is produced by students and contains information about the university as well as articles written by students. The second, Podium, is published monthly and features articles about education, society, law and politics, and other academic topics, written by experts in their field. This magazine is edited by Carlos Calderón with the editorial council. Dr. Carlos Ortega Maldonado, as chancellor of the university, writes the editorial every month.

Clubs and activities

UEES sponsors activities such as an Ecuadorian cultural week, a day of cultural diversity, and a University Queen contest.

UEES has clubs that are integrated into departments, such as the juridical club, technology club, journalism club, economic club, ecology club, leadership club, reading club, cinema club, travel club, international club, executives club, and the English club, as well as the Dinamika Marketing Club. The medical school and other students serve the poor through programs run by Hogar de Cristo, including homebuilding and education.

References

Private universities and colleges
Educational institutions established in 1993
Universities in Ecuador
Buildings and structures in Guayaquil
1993 establishments in Ecuador